Argon plasma coagulation (APC) is a medical endoscopic procedure used to control bleeding from certain lesions in the gastrointestinal tract. It is administered during esophagogastroduodenoscopy or colonoscopy.

Medical use
APC involves the use of a jet of ionized argon gas (plasma) directed through a probe passed through the endoscope. The probe is placed at some distance from the bleeding lesion, and argon gas is emitted, then ionized by a high-voltage discharge (approx 6kV). High-frequency electric current is then conducted through the jet of gas, resulting in coagulation of the bleeding lesion. As no physical contact is made with the lesion, the procedure is safe if the bowel has been cleaned of colonic gases, and can be used to treat bleeding in parts of the gastrointestinal tract with thin walls, such as the cecum. The depth of coagulation is usually only a few millimetres.

APC is used to treat the following conditions:
 angiodysplasias, anywhere in the GI tract
 gastric antral vascular ectasia, or watermelon stomach
 colonic polyps after polypectomy
 radiation proctitis
 esophageal cancer

See also 
 Electrocautery

References

Further reading 

 

Endoscopy
Digestive system procedures